The Town Hall of Colombo is the headquarters of the Colombo Municipal Council and the office of the Mayor of Colombo. Built in front of the Viharamahadevi Park, Colombo, Sri Lanka, it is the meeting place for the elected municipal council.

In 1921 renowned Scottish town planner, Professor Patrick Geddes, recommended that the Council should construct a large central and dignified municipal building to house the council, a public reception hall, the mayor's office and a public library. The need for the Colombo Public Library was addressed by a philanthropic donation of a building by Dr. W. Arthur Silva in 1925. This building, Sirinivasa, is now the official residence of the mayor.

In 1922 the Colombo Municipal Council held an international architectural design competition and in November that year of the 32 plans submitted, the winning design was drawn by S. J. Edwards, of the architectural firm Ralph Booty & Co. In awarding the prize the Government Architect of the Ceylon Public Works Department, Austin Woodeson, wrote:

The foundation stone for the town hall was laid on 24 May 1924, by the Mayor of Colombo, Thomas Reid, CCS. The construction of the building was undertaken by A. A. Gammon & Co and four years later on 9 August 1928 it was formally opened by the Governor Sir Herbert Stanley KCMG. The cost of the new town hall was met largely by revenue generated by the Council, without taking out any loans from the central government and as a result, for years Municipal finances were depleted.

Architectural design

Edwards' design draws heavily from L'Enfant's neoclassical style Capitol Building in Washington, D. C.

The Council chamber is located in the centre of the block on the first floor surmounted by a dome. On either side and on the longitudinal axis is an open courtyard surrounded on each floor by the different departments of Council. The main entrance and staircase hall is situated at the centre of the front façade, facing directly onto Viharamahadevi Park, with the two staff entrances being at the two remote corners of the façade in the rear. There are six corinthian columns in the main porch, six on either side to the front and ten columns on either side of the building. The columns are each  in height.

Although many alterations have been made to the original design, the building still possesses a few characteristics that have not been touched by modern renovations. The council chamber and its furniture, including the original lamps and lamp bases are still intact. All the doors and windows of the building are original, as well as the ornamental lamps on the staircase leading to the second floor from the lobby.

References

External links 

 

Buildings and structures in Colombo
City and town halls in Sri Lanka
Colombo Municipal Council
British colonial architecture in Sri Lanka
1927 establishments in Ceylon